The 1950 NCAA Tennis Championships were the 5th annual tournaments to determine the national champions of NCAA men's singles, doubles, and team collegiate tennis in the United States.

UCLA was awarded the team championship, the Bruins' first title. UCLA finished six points ahead of California and USC (11–5).

Host site
This year's tournaments were hosted by the University of Texas at Austin in Austin, Texas.

Team scoring
Until 1977, the men's team championship was determined by points awarded based on individual performances in the singles and doubles events.

References

External links
List of NCAA Men's Tennis Champions

NCAA Division I tennis championships
NCAA Division I Tennis Championships
NCAA Division I Tennis Championships